Basil II Kamateros, (died after 1186) was the Patriarch of Constantinople from August 1183 to February 1186.

Basil was a member of the Kamateros family, which provided a number of leading officials in the 12th century. He initially served under Manuel I Komnenos (r. 1143–1180) as a diplomat, but after a disastrous mission in Italy, he fell out of favour and was banished. His fortunes revived under Andronikos I Komnenos (r. 1183–1185), who had also been exiled by Manuel.

At the time, Andronikos was having trouble with Patriarch Theodosios Boradiotes, who opposed the emperor on a number of issues. These were the projected marriage of his illegitimate daughter Eirene to Alexios, the illegitimate son of Manuel I, although they were close relatives, as well as the expulsion of the Empress-Dowager Maria of Antioch from the Great Palace. Theodosius was forced to abdicate and replaced by Basil.

Basil immediately complied with Andronikos' wishes, clearing the path for the marriage and even absolving the murderers of the young emperor Alexios II Komnenos (r. 1180–1183). After Andronikos was overthrown and executed in September 1185 however, Basil failed to ingratiate himself with the new emperor Isaac II Angelos (r. 1185–1195 and 1203–1204), despite officiating at his coronation. He was deposed and condemned by a synod for his approval of Eirene's and Alexios' marriage. Nothing further is known of him after that.

References

Sources 

 

12th-century births
1180s deaths
Year of death unknown
12th-century patriarchs of Constantinople
Kamateros family